Lucien Reid (born 19 October 1993) is an English professional boxer who challenged for the British and Commonwealth super-bantamweight titles in 2019.

Amateur career
Reid won the 2013 Amateur Boxing Association British bantamweight title, when boxing out of the West Ham ABC.

Professional career
Reid made his professional debut on 30 May 2015, scoring a fourth-round technical knockout (TKO) victory over Elemir Rafael at The O2 Arena, London.

After compiling a record of 8–0 (4 KOs), he faced Ingi Sangha in March 2019. Following an accidental clash of heads, Reid suffered a cut above his right eye. Reid's corner was unable to stem the flow of blood which ultimately promoted referee Kieran McCann to call the fight off in the third round, resulting in a technical draw (TD).

In his next fight he challenged British, and Commonwealth super-bantamweight champion Brad Foster on 14 September at the York Hall in London, resulting in a majority draw (MD). Two judges scored the bout even at 114–114, while the third scored it 116–112 to Reid.

A rematch with Foster was held on 22 February 2020, again at the York Hall, with only the British title on the line, serving as domestic build-up for Deontay Wilder vs. Tyson Fury II later that night. Reid retired at the end of the sixth round.

Professional boxing record

References

Living people
1993 births
English male boxers
Boxers from Greater London
Super-bantamweight boxers